The 1973 Texas Rangers season involved the Rangers finishing sixth in the American League West with a record of 57 wins and 105 losses.

Offseason 
 October 27, 1972: Jim Panther was traded by the Rangers to the Atlanta Braves for Rico Carty.
 November 30, 1972: Horacio Piña was traded by the Rangers to the Oakland Athletics for Mike Epstein.
 November 30, 1972: Tom Ragland was traded by the Texas Rangers to the Cleveland Indians for Vince Colbert.
 January 10, 1973: 1973 Major League Baseball Draft
Jeff Schneider was drafted by the Rangers in the 2nd round, but did not sign.
Jim Sundberg was drafted by the Rangers in the 1st round (2nd pick) of the Secondary Phase.

Regular season 
On July 30, 1973, Jim Bibby threw the first no-hitter in Texas Rangers history as he no-hit the Oakland Athletics. The Rangers won the game 6–0.

Season standings

Record vs. opponents

Notable transactions 
 May 20, 1973: Mike Epstein, Rich Hand and Rick Stelmaszek were traded by the Rangers to the California Angels for Jim Spencer and Lloyd Allen.
 June 5, 1973: David Clyde was drafted by the Rangers in the 1st round (1st pick) of the 1973 Major League Baseball Draft.
 July 11, 1973: Jim Fregosi was purchased by the Rangers from the New York Mets.

David Clyde 
David Clyde was a high school pitching phenom who was made the number one overall pick in the 1973 June draft. 22 days later, without having played in the minor leagues, Clyde made his MLB debut, the youngest player to play in an MLB game that year. Clyde won his first ever major league start (in front of a sellout crowd at Arlington Stadium, the first sellout in club history) and played in eighteen games (all starts) that season, finishing with a record of 4–8, with a 5.01 ERA.

Roster

Player stats

Batting

Starters by position 
Note: Pos = Position; G = Games played; AB = At bats; H = Hits; Avg. = Batting average; HR = Home runs; RBI = Runs batted in

Other batters 
Note: G = Games played; AB = At bats; H = Hits; Avg. = Batting average; HR = Home runs; RBI = Runs batted in

Pitching

Starting pitchers 
Note: G = Games pitched; IP = Innings pitched; W = Wins; L = Losses; ERA = Earned run average; SO = Strikeouts

Other pitchers 
Note: G = Games pitched; IP = Innings pitched; W = Wins; L = Losses; ERA = Earned run average; SO = Strikeouts

Relief pitchers 
Note: G = Games pitched; W = Wins; L = Losses; SV = Saves; ERA = Earned run average; SO = Strikeouts

Farm system 

LEAGUE CHAMPIONS: Spokane, GCL Rangers

Notes

References 

1973 Texas Rangers team page at Baseball Reference
1973 Texas Rangers team page at www.baseball-almanac.com

Texas Rangers seasons
Texas Rangers season
Texas Rang